Invitation is an album by American jazz pianist Andrew Hill, recorded in 1974 and released on the Danish SteepleChase label. The album features five of Hill's original compositions and one jazz standard performed by Hill in a trio with bassist Christopher White and drummer Art Lewis. The CD added an alternate take as a bonus track.

Reception

The Allmusic review by Ken Dryden awarded the album 4 stars stating "Such fascinating music will be of great interest to fans of Andrew Hill".

Track listing
All compositions by Andrew Hill except as indicated
 "Catfish" – 6:31  
 "Lost No More" – 5:23  
 "Morning Flower" – 12:19  
 "Invitation" (Bronisław Kaper) – 8:40  
 "Laverne" – 7:33  
 "Little John" – 6:51  
 "Catfish" [alternate take] - 10:39 Bonus track on CD  
Recorded at Minot Sound Studios, White Plains, New York on October 17, 1974

Personnel
Andrew Hill – piano
Chris White – bass
Art Lewis – drums

References

SteepleChase Records albums
Andrew Hill albums
1974 albums